KMOH-TV (channel 6) is a television station in Kingman, Arizona, United States, airing programming from MeTV. Owned and operated by Weigel Broadcasting, the station has studios on Kingman Avenue in Kingman, and its transmitter is located atop Oatman Mountain, near Oatman, Arizona.

KEJR-LD (channel 40) in Phoenix operates as a low-power translator of KMOH-TV; this station's transmitter is located atop South Mountain on the city's south side.

History
An original construction permit to build a television station on VHF channel 6 in Kingman granted to Grand Canyon Television Co. on April 8, 1985. Its transmitter facilities were to be located at Hualapai Peak, operating at an effective radiated power (ERP) of 10 kW. The permit was modified in August 1986 to specify Black Mountain as the transmitter location with an ERP of 100 kW, which was the maximum allowed for a low-band VHF station. The station first signed on the air on February 22, 1988, and was licensed on June 1.

During the late 1980s and early 1990s, KMOH was an English-language independent station, and also produced its own local newscast. In September 1995, KMOH became an affiliate of The WB. It was listed as an American Independent Network (AIN) affiliate in July 1996, and has also been listed as a Network One (N1) affiliate at an unknown date. KMOH was still primarily a WB affiliate in May 1997, when the broadcasting arm of the Gannett Company (now Tegna Inc.) bought the station, along with KNAZ-TV in Flagstaff, from Grand Canyon Television Company. In November 1999, Gannett converted KMOH into a satellite station of Phoenix-based NBC affiliate KPNX (channel 12). It was perceived as a redundant move, as KPNX was already available on cable in the Kingman area.

In August 2004, Bela Broadcasting, looking to expand the reach of its family-oriented Spanish-language format, acquired KMOH from Gannett, making the station a Spanish-language independent station, airing mostly the same content as its Oxnard, California station KBEH, but on a different schedule. From Kingman, Bela hoped to put signals into the Phoenix and Las Vegas markets, both of which have large Hispanic populations. While it cannot be verified as a reason for buying KMOH, a full-power station in the Phoenix media market, it is clear that Bela Broadcasting desired must-carry cable coverage in Phoenix as well. KMOH fought the exclusion, but lost, in large part due to the station's lack of local programming directed at Phoenix viewers, and also in part due to not being receivable in Phoenix. In November 2005, Bela Broadcasting acquired KQBN-LP (channel 43, now KEJR-LP) from Una Vez Más Holdings, and made it a translator station of KMOH-TV, giving the station a translator in Phoenix. As Phoenix is the much larger market, both stations were branded as "KEJR 43 Phoenix" instead of as "KMOH 6".

On November 27, 2006, Bela dropped the Spanish independent format from all of its stations and made them affiliates of MTV Tr3́s. Bela Broadcasting sold KMOH and KEJR to Hero Broadcasting in January 2008. KMOH and KEJR became charter affiliates of the MundoFox Spanish-language network when it launched on August 1, 2012, replacing Tr3́s. MundoFox changed its name to MundoMax in 2015, and shut down on December 1, 2016; KMOH-TV and KEJR-LD then switched affiliations to América TeVé. HC2 Holdings agreed to acquire KMOH-TV and KEJR-LD from Hero Broadcasting on December 29, 2017; the sale was completed on June 18, 2018. HC2 replaced América TeVé programming with Azteca América, which is also owned by HC2.

In December 2020, HC2 sold KMOH-TV and KEJR-LD, along with two other stations, to Weigel Broadcasting, owner of (or managing partner in) five diginets. MeTV was placed on KMOH 6.1 on February 13, 2021.

KEJR-LD history pre-2005
Raul Infante, Jr. was granted an original construction permit for a television station on UHF channel 31, which was assigned the callsign K31DI, on June 5, 1992, and licensed on August 22, 1995. The original transmitter site was in Sun City. Early programming is unknown.

In June 1998, Infante sold the station to Hispanic Television of Phoenix, who in turn sold it to Television Apogeo de Phoenix in October. In 1999, the FCC granted Fox owned-and-operated station KSAZ-TV (channel 10) permission to build its digital signal on channel 31; as a result, K31DI was forced to move to another channel. Television Apogeo took the station silent in March 2000, but returned it to the air in October, when the company was granted Special Temporary Authority to operate on channel 43. Television Apogeo licensed the station on channel 43 with new call letters, K43GV, in December 2001. By this time, it was simulcasting Telemundo programming from KDRX-CA (now KDPH-LP).

Una Vez Más Holdings acquired the station in January 2004 and applied to move the transmitter location from Sun City to South Mountain in Phoenix. The permit was granted and the new facilities were licensed in October 2005. Meanwhile, Una Vez Más resurrected a set of call letters the company had used for its station in Tucson, and renamed the station KQBN-LP in March 2005. Telemundo programming was also replaced by the Spanish-language Christian network Almavision.

Even before the station was licensed at its new South Mountain transmitter site, Una Vez Mas sold the station to Bela Broadcasting, with the transaction finalized in November 2005. Upon taking ownership, Bela again changed the call letters, this time to KEJR-LP, and made the station a translator for KMOH-TV.

Technical information

Subchannels
The stations' digital signals are multiplexed:

Analog-to-digital conversion
KMOH-TV shut down its analog signal, over VHF channel 6, on June 12, 2009, the official date in which full-power television stations in the United States transitioned from analog to digital broadcasts under federal mandate. The station's digital signal remained on its pre-transition UHF channel 19. Through the use of PSIP, digital television receivers display the station's virtual channel as its former VHF analog channel 6.

References

External links
 Multichannel News article about the switch to MTV Tr3s
 FCC ruling in Cox must-carry case (PDF)

Television channels and stations established in 1988
1988 establishments in Arizona
MOH-TV
Story Television affiliates
Kingman, Arizona
Weigel Broadcasting